Seva Novgorodsev MBE (Russian: Се́ва Новгоро́дцев, which is a pseudonym, his real name being Vsevolod Borisovich Levenstein (Всеволод Борисович Левенштейн); born 9 July 1940) is a former radio presenter on the BBC Russian Service, and is famous through the former Soviet Union.

He created the music programme «Рок-посевы» ("Rock sowing" or "Rock crops", in Russian containing a pun with the name Seva) and the chat shows «Севаоборот» (Sevaoborot, a pun with the Russian word sevooborot, "crop rotation") and «БибиСева» (BBSeva). He has also written the books «Рок-Посевы» (Rock the Seva way) and «Секс, наркотики, рок-н-ролл» (Sex, drugs, rock 'n' roll).

He was Russia's first radio deejay, and he has also features in a number of films.  In 1981 he married actress Karen Craig, with whom he co-wrote a Russian cookbook for Sainsbury's in 1990, but they later divorced. He is now married to Olga, who is a designer.

On 4 September 2015, at the age of 75, Seva retired from broadcasting.

Filmography
A View to a Kill (1985) - Soviet Helicopter Pilot
Spies Like Us (1985) - Tadzhik Highway Patrolman
Leto (2018) - Antiquarian

References

External links
 BBC, "Seva Novgorodsev: The DJ who 'brought down the USSR'", 5 September 2015

Seva's page on the BBC Russian Service website
BBC Russian Service online
Seva's personal site (mirror)

British radio presenters
British music journalists
BBC World Service people
Russian emigrants to the United Kingdom
Russian music journalists
Russian Jews
Members of the Order of the British Empire
1940 births
Living people